The Manitoba Hockey Hall of Fame and Museum is a hall of fame and museum for ice hockey in Manitoba, located on the main level of the Canada Life Centre in downtown Winnipeg.

It was established in 1985, when the first honoured members were named and plaques were erected in their honour. The first group of inductees was large in order to recognize the accomplishments of Manitoba players, coaches, builders, and teams at the international, national, provincial, and local levels for many years. Induction ceremonies were held on an annual or bi-annual basis through 1993. Since 1995, the Foundation has added to its honour-roll every second year.

The Players Wall is just inside the main entrance in the northeast corner and the Builders Wall is in the northwest corner. A Wall of Champions for teams in the Hall of Fame is located opposite the Builders Wall. The museum also includes a tribute to Olympic gold medallists and an enclosed memorabilia area. Until it was relocated to the MTS Centre (now Canada Life Centre) in late 2004, the Manitoba Hockey Hall of Fame and Museum was housed in the Winnipeg Arena. The Foundation also maintains a Wall of Fame photo gallery in the Canad Inns Polo Park in Winnipeg.

All-Star Teams
In 2000, the Manitoba Hockey Foundation recognized a century of hockey excellence in Manitoba, with its announcement of its Manitoba Hockey Hall of Fame All-Star Teams - the "Best".
1st All-Star Team
Goal - Terry Sawchuk
Defence - Babe Pratt, Jack Stewart
Forwards - Andy Bathgate, Bobby Clarke, Bill Mosienko
Coach - Dick Irvin
2nd All-Star Team
Goal - Chuck Gardiner
Defence - Ching Johnson, Ken Reardon
Forwards - Frank Fredrickson, Bryan Hextall, Reg Leach
Coach - Billy Reay
Player of the Century Terry Sawchuk
Coach of the Century Dick Irvin
Referee of the Century Andy Van Hellemond

Players

A-D
A
Reg Abbott
Gary Aldcorn
Jack Armytage
Chuck Arnason

B

Dan Bain
Murray Balagus
Doug Baldwin
Terry Ball
Murray Bannerman
Andy Bathgate
Paul Baxter
Ed Belfour
Gordon Bell
Joe Bell
Lin Bend
Bill Benson
Gary Bergman
Andy Blair
Rick Blight
Larry Bolonchuk
Dan Bonar
Laurie Boschman
Jennifer Botterill
Ralph Bowman
Jack Bownass
Wally Boyer
Darren Boyko
Andy Branigan
Billy Breen
Turk Broda
Cecil Browne
Ray Brunel
Ed Bruneteau
Mud Bruneteau
Walter Byron

C
Randy Carlyle
Bruce Carmichael
Art Chapman
Ron Chipperfield
Elliot Chorley
Bob Chrystal
Bobby Clarke
 Cam Connor
William Cockburn
Joe Cooper
Art Coulter
Rosario Couture
Joe Crozier
Wilf Cude

D
Joe Daley
Bill Derlago
Ernie Dickens
Jordy Douglas
Tom Dunderdale
Fred Dunsmore
Red Dutton

E-K
E
Brian Engblom
Dean Evason
Bill Ezinicki

F
Bill Fairbairn
Pat Falloon
Gord Fashoway
Wilf Field
Bob Fitchner
Rod Flett
Mike Ford
Jimmy Foster
Bill Fraser
Frank Fredrickson
Karl Friesen
Theo Fleury

G
Chuck Gardiner
Herb Gardiner
Cal Gardner
Curt Giles
Randy Gilhen
Billy Gooden
Magnus Goodman
Paul Goodman
Butch Goring
Ted Green

H

Halldor Halldorson
Joe Hall
Al Hamilton
Ted Hampson
Glen Hanlon
Glen Harmon
Ted Harris
Gerry Hart
Dale Hawerchuk
George Hay
Andy Hebenton
Anders Hedberg
Bill Heindl Sr.
Jim Henry
Phil Hergesheimer
Wally Hergesheimer
Bryan Hextall
Bryan Hextall Jr.
Dennis Hextall
Ron Hextall
Mel Hill
Cecil Hoekstra
Ed Hoekstra
Barney Holden
Howie Hughes
Jack Hughes
Bobby Hull

I
Dick Irvin
Ted Irvine

J
Gerry James
Ching Johnson
Dan Johnson
Jim Johnson
Tom Johnson
Bill Juzda

K
Robert Kabel
Pete Kapusta
Vaughn Karpan
Mike Keane
Mickey Keating
Pete Kelly
Bill Kendall
Sheldon Kennedy
Trevor Kidd
Neil Komadoski
George Konik
Dick Kowcinak
Arnie Kullman
Ed Kullman

L-Q
L
Gord Labossiere
Gord Lane
Pete Langelle
Wayne Larkin
Reggie Leach
Grant Ledyard
Butch Lee
Chuck Lefley
Bob Leiter
Bill Lesuk
Victor Lindquist
Clem Loughlin
Ron Low

M

Bill MacKenzie
Ray Manson
John Marks
Bill Masterton
Fred Maxwell
Eddie Mazur
Dunc McCallum
Kevin McCarthy
John McCreedy
Ab McDonald
Jim McFadden
William Meronek
Nick Mickoski
Bill Mikkelson
Perry Miller
Walter Monson
Jay More
John Morrison
Lew Morrison
Bill Mosienko
Harry Mummery
Murray Murdoch
Bill Murray
Marty Murray

N
Eric Nesterenko
Ray Neufeld
Ulf Nilsson
Baldy Northcott

O
Chris Oddleifson
Harry Oliver

P
Ross Parke
James Patrick
Steve Patrick
Mitch Pechet
Cliff Pennington
Alf Pike
Paul Platz
Babe Pratt

R-Z
R
Bill Ranford
Don Raleigh
Chuck Rayner
Ken Reardon
Terry Reardon
Billy Reay
Tom Rendall
Art Rice-Jones
Curt Ridley
Mike Ridley
Gus Rivers
Romeo Rivers
Bill Robinson
Duane Rupp
Church Russell
Jack Ruttan

S

Billy Saunders
Terry Sawchuk
Chuck Scherza
Dave Semenko
Johnny Sheppard
Fred Shero
Alex Shibicky
Gord Simpson
Joe Simpson
Lars Sjoberg
Ed Slowinski
Dallas Smith
Art Somers
Wally Stanowski
Thomas Steen
Pete Stemkowski
Wayne Stephenson
Jack Stewart
Blaine Stoughton
Art Stratton
Gordon Stratton
Danny Summers
Bill Sutherland

T
Harry Taylor
Ted Taylor
Jimmy Thomson
Len Thornson
Del Topoll

W
Ernie Wakely
Nick Wasnie
Bill Watson
Blake Watson
Murray Wilkie
Neil Wilkinson
Carey Wilson
Cully Wilson
Steve Witiuk
Bob Woytowich
Ken Wregget

Y
Terry Yake
Mike Yaschuk
Norm Yellowlees
Susana Yuen

Z
Chick Zamick
Bruno Zarrillo

Builders

William Addison
Aime Allaire
George Allard
Bill Allum
Edward Armstrong
Don Baizley
Denis Ball
Addie Bell
J.P. Bend
Barry Bonni
Ralph Borger
Jack Bourke
Abbie Coo
Bob Cornell
Wayne Chernecki
Fred Creighton
Gary Cribbs
Mike Daski
R.H. Davie
Earl Dawson
Larry Desjardins
Don Dietrich
Jimmy Dunn
Heavy Evason
R.A. Fabro
Russ Farrell
Noel Filbey
Wayne Fleming
Ted Foreman
Harry Foxton
Ray Frost
E. A. Gilroy
Pat Ginnell
Michael Gobuty
Jackie Gordon
Al Hares
Ben Hatskin
Steve Hawrysh
Ian Heather
Ernie Hildebrand
Terry Hind
Vic Johnson
William Johnston
Robert Kirk
Mike Kryschuk
Greg Lacomy
Glen Lawson
Al Leader
Vince Leah
Bryan Lefley
Pat Lyon
Don Mackenzie
Bill Maluta
Jimm Mann
Fred Marples
Cal Marvins
Frank Mathers
Joe Mathewson
Jill Mathez
Kelly McCrimmon
Dennis McDonald
Frank McKinnon
Jake Milford
Tom Miller
Morris Mott
Andy Mulligan
Andy Murray
Harry Neil
Horace Nicholson
John Paddock
Gord Pennell
Jack Perrin
Max Pilous
Rudy Pilous
Claude C. Robinson
Lawrence Russell
Gladwyn Scott
Barry Shenkarow
Robert Simpson
Clark Simpson
Jim Skinner
Bruce Southern
Sam Southern
Sam Tascona
Dr. W. F. Taylor
Ken Tibbatts
Al Tresoor
Dr. Jack Waugh
Murray Williamson
Dianne Woods

Officials

Perry Allan
Hyland Beatty
Ted Blondal
Dick Davis
Andy Gurba
Rob Haithwaite
Alex Irvin
Lou Joyal
Gord Kerr
Danny Kurdydyk
Don Kuryk
Laura Loeppky
Lorne Lyndon
Rob Martell
Almer McKerlie
Morley Meyers
Lloyd Orchard
William Earl Ormshaw
Allan Paradice
Ed Sweeney
Bob Thompson
Bud Ulrich
Gerry Varnes
Andy Van Hellemond
Joe Vinet

Media

Arthur Carlyon Allan
Dallis Beck
Mo Cartman
Jim Coleman
Howard Crawford
Reyn Davis
Edward Dearden
Trent Frayne
Vic Grant
Bob Holliday
Curt Kellbeck
Jack Matheson
Ken McKenzie
Stewart McPherson
Ken Nicolson
Scott Oake
Bob Picken
Hal Sigurdson
Maurice Smith
Jack Wells
Don Wittman
Scott Young

Teams

Stanley Cup Champions
1896 Winnipeg Victorias
1901 Winnipeg Victorias

Olympic Champions
1920 Winnipeg Falcons
1932 Winnipeg Hockey Club

IIHF World Champions
1931 University of Manitoba Grads
1935 Winnipeg Monarchs

Avco Cup Champions
1976 Winnipeg Jets
1978 Winnipeg Jets
1979 Winnipeg Jets

Edinburgh Cup Champions
1956 Winnipeg Warriors

Canadian University Champions
1965 University of Manitoba

Allan Cup Champions
1911 Winnipeg Victorias
1912 Winnipeg Victorias
1913 Winnipeg Hockey Club
1915 Winnipeg Monarchs
1916 Winnipeg 61st Battalion
1920 Winnipeg Falcons
1923 University of Manitoba Junior Hockey Club
1932 Winnipeg Hockey Club
1928 University of Manitoba Varsity Hockey Club
1964 Winnipeg Maroons
1994 Warroad Lakers
1995 Warroad Lakers
1996 Warroad Lakers
2003 Île-des-Chênes North Stars

Edmonton Journal Trophy Winners
1952 Dauphin Kings
1955 Brandon Wheat Kings
1957 Pine Falls Paper Kings
1964 Warroad Lakers
1966 Flin Flon Warriors

Hardy Cup Champions
1974 Warroad Lakers
1983 Winnipeg North End Flyers

Memorial Cup Champions
1921 Winnipeg Junior Falcons
1923 University of Manitoba Junior Hockey Club
1931 Elmwood Millionaires
1935 Winnipeg Monarchs
1937 Winnipeg Monarchs
1938 St. Boniface Seals
1941 Winnipeg Rangers
1942 Portage Terriers
1943 Winnipeg Rangers
1946 Winnipeg Monarchs
1957 Flin Flon Bombers
1959 Winnipeg Braves

Centennial Cup Champions
1973 Portage Terriers
1974 Selkirk Steelers

Abbott Cup Champions

1921 Winnipeg Junior Falcons
1923 University of Manitoba Junior Hockey Club
1929 Elmwood Millionaires
1931 Elmwood Millionaires
1932 Winnipeg Monarchs
1937 Winnipeg Monarchs
1938 St. Boniface Seals
1940 Kenora Thistles
1941 Winnipeg Rangers
1942 Portage Terriers
1943 Winnipeg Rangers
1946 Winnipeg Monarchs
1949 Brandon Wheat Kings
1951 Winnipeg Monarchs
1953 St. Boniface Canadiens
1957 Flin Flon Bombers
1959 Winnipeg Braves
1973 Portage Terriers
1974 Selkirk Steelers
1995 Winnipeg South Blues

See also
Manitoba Sports Hall of Fame and Museum
Hockey Hall of Fame

References

External links
Manitoba Hockey Hall of Fame

Awards established in 1985
Ice hockey in Manitoba
Ice hockey museums and halls of fame
Halls of fame in Canada
Canadian sports trophies and awards
Sports museums in Canada
Museums in Winnipeg
1985 establishments in Manitoba
Manitoba awards
True North Sports & Entertainment